A powder horn was a container for gunpowder.

Powder Horn or Powder horn may also refer to:

 Powder Horn (album), 2014 album by Shit and Shine
 Powder Horn (Boy Scouts of America), the Venturing training program offered by the Boy Scouts of America 
 Powder Horn Island, former name of Calumet Island in the Thousand Islands region of New York
 Powder Horn Mountain, a community in Triplett, Watauga County, North Carolina
 Powder Horn, Wyoming, a census-designated place

See also
 Powderhorn (disambiguation)